is a 2003 Japanese comedy drama directed by Takanori Jinnai. It is a fictional account of real-life Japanese rock band, The Rockers.

Cast 
 Yumi Asō
 Ryūnosuke Kamiki
 Katsuya Kobayashi
 Hiroko Isayama
 Toru Kazama
 Yutaka Matsushige
 Kōichi Satō
 Hakuryu
 Hanawa

External links
 
 Rockers at AllCinema 
 Rockers at KineNote 

2003 films
2003 comedy-drama films
2003 directorial debut films
2003 comedy films
2003 drama films
Japanese comedy-drama films
2000s Japanese films